National Golf Links of America is a prestigious links-style golf course in Southampton, New York, located on Long Island between Shinnecock Hills Golf Club and Peconic Bay. Though the course is noted for hosting the initial Walker Cup in 1922, which the United States won 8 and 4, it has never hosted a major men's championship. The Walker Cup was again held at the National in 2013. The private club has been called "America's snootiest golf course" due to its exclusive nature.

History

The course was designed by Charles B. Macdonald, who had been schooled at the University of St Andrews in Scotland during the 1870s. Macdonald was introduced to golf at St. Andrews old course, playing many rounds there with Tom Morris, Sr. and Tom Morris, Jr., both of whom were multiple winners of the Open Championship, founded in 1860 as the first major championship in golf.

Macdonald, the founder and original designer of the Chicago Golf Club, had been paired with John Shippen, an African American, in the 1896 U.S. Open at Shinnecock Hills. Following the event, he quit Shinnecock and founded the new club. He set out to design a course that would rival the prominent golf courses located abroad, looking at potential sites in Cape Cod and Napeague before settling on a plot of land on Sebonac Neck next to Peconic Bay. Macdonald relied on his extensive knowledge of Britain's finest holes, using them as templates for his new course.

The course was constructed adjacent to Shinnecock Hills Golf Club, and now also borders Sebonack Golf Club, which opened in 2006. Construction of the golf course was supervised by Seth Raynor, a local civil engineer from Long Island who went on to design several golf courses of his own, including the Fishers Island Club.

When it opened in 1911, the course was called the National Golf Links of America because its 67 founding members, which included Robert Bacon, George W. Baxter, Urban H. Broughton, Charles Deering, James Deering, Findlay S. Douglas, Henry Clay Frick, Elbert Henry Gary, Clarence Mackay, De Lancey Nicoll, James A. Stillman, Walter Travis, and William Kissam Vanderbilt II, resided in various parts of the United States. The clubhouse was designed by Jarvis Hunt, one of the club's founding members. James Hepburn—one of the founding members of the PGA of America—served as one of the early head professionals, working at the club from 1914 until 1928.  There is a small bar half-way round the course which contains P.G. Wodehouse memorabilia, and the course is mentioned, surprisingly negatively, in the preface to The Heart of a Goof short story collection.

The National Golf Links of America was selected as the host of the 2013 Walker Cup in September 2008.  In 2009, "The National" was ranked 15th in Golf Digest's list of America's 100 Greatest Golf Courses.

The current head golf professional is Jim Morris.

On April 18, 2018 the right wing of the building caught fire, but was extinguished by local fire departments causing minimal damage to the exterior.

Course design
The course is a par 72 and plays  from the back tees. Many of the holes were patterned from famous golf courses in the British Isles and adapted to fit the local setting:

The 2nd hole, named "Sahara", is a par four modeled after the 3rd hole at Royal St. George.
The 3rd hole, named "Alps", is a par four that requires a blind approach shot to the green, similar to the 17th hole at Prestwick.
The 4th hole, named "Redan", is a par three that copied the 15th hole at North Berwick, the site of the original Redan hole.
The 7th hole, named "St. Andrews", is a par five that was designed based on the 17th hole (Road Hole) at St. Andrews.
The 8th hole, named "Bottle", is a par four that resembles the 12th hole at Sunningdale Golf Club.
The 13th hole, named "Eden", is a par three that replicates the 11th hole at St. Andrews.

Some of the other holes were original designs, the most notable of which is the par four 14th hole. It was named "Cape" because the green was located on a small peninsula that jutted into a bay. The green was later moved during construction of Sebonac Inlet Road but is now surrounded on three sides by a large bunker.  A unique feature on the golf course is a windmill located between the 2nd and 16th holes. A member once remarked that a windmill would make a nice addition to the course, so Macdonald purchased one when he was in Europe and sent the member the bill.

References

External links
 
Layout of National Golf Course including map
Long Island Golf News

	

Golf clubs and courses in New York (state)
Golf clubs and courses designed by Charles B. Macdonald
Walker Cup venues
Sports venues in Suffolk County, New York
Southampton (town), New York
1911 establishments in New York (state)
Sports venues completed in 1911